This article lists the cast and characters in the American fantasy legal television series Drop Dead Diva, which debuted on Lifetime July 12, 2009.

Cast

Jane Bingum and Stacy Barrett

Jane's guardian angels

Harrison & Parker employees

Other legal professionals

Jane's family

Other supporting characters

Celebrity guest stars
Many celebrities have made guest appearances on the show.

References

Drop Dead Diva
Drop Dead Diva
Drop Dead Diva